Shantiraj Khosla (7 October 1966 – 27 May 2021) was an Indian music composer and singer who mainly worked in the Odia film and music industry.

Early life 
Shantiraj was born on 7 October 1966, in Jeypore, Odisha, India. He was a student of Vikram Dev College, Jeypore.

Career 
Khosla was a guitarist and mandolin player. He started his musical career with Akashvani Jaipur. Later he came to Cuttack and learned Hindustani classical music. After that, he started composing some Odia music albums, bhajans. In 2002, he started composing Odia film songs. His first Odia film was Wrong Number. He has worked in more than 20 movies and around 2,000 Odia album songs.

In 2019, he won the Odisha State Film Awards-2018 for Odia film Pheria.

Composer 
 2014: Jai Hind
 2012: ACP Ranveer
 2011: Baishi Pahache Kheliba Mina
 2010: Tora More Jodi Sundara
 2010: Aakhi Palakare Tu
 2010: Don
 2009: Keun Dunia Ru Asila Bandhu
 2008: Mate Ani Dela Lakhye Faguna
 2008: Mu Sapanara Soudagar
 2008: Dhanare Rakhibu Sapatha Mora
 2007: Bandhu (Odia part)
 2007: To Bina Mo Kahani Addha
 2002: Wrong Number

Death 
Khosla died from COVID-19 related issues at SCB Medical college and Hospital, Cuttack on 27 May 2021, during its pandemic in India. He tested COVID positive on 19 May and was in home isolation when was rushed to SCB Medical after he developed health complications on 22 May.

References

External links
 

1966 births
2021 deaths
People from Jeypore
Indian composers
Singers from Odisha
Deaths from the COVID-19 pandemic in India